Bethany is a village in Moultrie County, Illinois, United States. The population was 1,255 at the 2020 census.

Geography

Demographics

As of the census of 2000, there were 1,287 people, 544 households, and 386 families residing in the village. The racial makeup of the village was 98.99% White, 0.08% African American, 0.16% Native American, 0.31% from other races, and 0.47% from two or more races. Hispanic or Latino of any race were 0.23% of the population.

There were 544 households, out of which 28.3% had children under the age of 18 living with them, 61.4% were married couples living together, 6.6% had a female householder with no husband present, and 29.0% were non-families. 25.9% of all households were made up of individuals, and 15.1% had someone living alone who was 65 years of age or older. The average household size was 2.37 and the average family size was 2.84.

In the village, the population was spread out, with 23.0% under the age of 18, 7.3% from 18 to 24, 26.1% from 25 to 44, 25.6% from 45 to 64, and 18.0% who were 65 years of age or older. The median age was 40 years. For every 100 females, there were 95.9 males. For every 100 females age 18 and over, there were 90.2 males.

The median income for a household in the village was $34,091, and the median income for a family was $44,276. Males had a median income of $36,250 versus $20,603 for females. The per capita income for the village was $16,888. About 5.7% of families and 7.4% of the population were below the poverty line, including 14.0% of those under age 18 and 7.0% of those age 65 or over.

Education
Bethany is home to Okaw Valley Community Unit School District 302. Okaw Valley is a K-12 district that was created in 2001 when the schools of Bethany and Findlay consolidated their individual school districts. The elementary and high school are located in Bethany while the middle school is located in Findlay. Okaw Valley's school sports teams have the nickname "Timberwolves" and compete in the “Lincoln Prairie Conference.”

Notable people
 Wesley Livsey Jones, U.S. Senator of Washington state 1909-32, was born in Bethany.

References

External links
 

Villages in Moultrie County, Illinois
Villages in Illinois